Émile Bachelet (30 January 1863 – 2 May 1946) was a French-American inventor. In the 1880s, he worked in the United States as an electrician. After discovering therapeutic qualities of magnetic fields especially with arthritis patients, he began to commercialize this practice. While doing so Bachelet began to experiment with magnetic fields. 

Bachelet was born in Nanterre, the son of Henri Bachelet. He immigrated to the United States in 1883 and became an American citizen in 1889. He died in Poughkeepsie, New York.

Bachelet proposed, and was awarded a patent for his "Levitating Transmitting Apparatus." which was meant to transfer mail and small packages on a cart which was levitated above a track of magnets.

In 1914 he presented a model to the Admiralty where a one-meter-long aluminum mobile agent hovered in a state of levitation, one centimeter above an 11-meter-long guide (which was the first example of a magnetic levitation train). The press used the words "flying train".

Winston Churchill who assisted the demonstration said it was the most wonderful thing he had ever seen in his life.

References 

19th-century French inventors
French emigrants to the United States
1863 births
1946 deaths